The 1957 Texas A&M Aggies football team represented Texas A&M University in the 1957 NCAA University Division football season. The Aggies offense scored 158 points while the defense allowed 50points. Led by head coach Bear Bryant, the Aggies competed in the Gator Bowl.

Schedule

Roster
QB Charlie Milstead, So.

Team players drafted into the NFL

Awards and honors
John David Crow, Heisman Trophy

References

Texas AandM
Texas A&M Aggies football seasons
Texas AandM Aggies football